Fuel Cell Energy may be:

 the electrochemical device, Fuel Cell
 the energy company, FuelCell Energy